Maria Clara Lobo (born 3 September 1998) is a Brazilian synchronised swimmer. She competed in the team event at the 2016 Summer Olympics.

References

External links
 

1998 births
Living people
Brazilian synchronized swimmers
Olympic synchronized swimmers of Brazil
Synchronized swimmers at the 2016 Summer Olympics
Place of birth missing (living people)
Synchronized swimmers at the 2015 Pan American Games
Pan American Games competitors for Brazil
21st-century Brazilian women